Cryn or Cryns is a given name and surname. Notable people with the name include:

Vincent Cryns, American endocrinologist
Yvonne Cryns (born 1951), American midwife and political activist
Cryn Fredericks, chief engineer of the New Netherland colony in 1625 and 1626